Willis Franklin Jefcoat (September 3, 1908 – November 4, 2001) was a Canadian politician. He served in the Legislative Assembly of British Columbia from 1960 to 1972, as a Social Credit member for the constituencies of Salmon Arm and Shuswap.

References

American emigrants to Canada
People from Roger Mills County, Oklahoma
British Columbia Social Credit Party MLAs
1908 births
2001 deaths